Albert William Thomas Orsborn (4 September 1886 – 4 February 1967) was the 6th General of The Salvation Army (1946–1954). He became an Officer of The Salvation Army in 1905. Albert served as a Corps Officer and in divisional work in the British Territory of the Army. In 1909, he married his first wife, Captain Evalina Barker.

In 1925, he was sent to serve as Chief Side Officer at the International Training College. In 1933, he was farewelled to New Zealand as Chief Secretary. He then became Territorial Commander of Scotland and Ireland in 1936. In 1940, he became British Commissioner.

Albert Orsborn's first wife, Captain Evalina Barker, died in 1942. This was a very hard time for him. Two years later, in 1944, he married his second wife, Major Evelyn Berry. They were married for just a year when she died.

In 1946, the High Council of The Salvation Army elected Albert to become the General of The Salvation Army. He married his third wife, Commissioner Mrs Phillis Taylor (a daughter of General Higgins), in 1947.

General Orsborn served as General for eight years. He was the author of The House of My Pilgrimage. He retired on 30 June 1954.

General Albert Orsborn died at the age of 80 years and 5 months.

External links
 Albert Orsborn at The Salvation Army
 

1886 births
1967 deaths
English Salvationists
British Salvationists
Christian writers
Salvation Army officers